The 2022 Étoile de Bessèges – Tour du Gard was a road cycling stage race that took place between 2 and 6 February 2022 almost entirely within the French department of Gard. The race was rated as a category 2.1 event on the 2022 UCI Europe Tour calendar, and was the 52nd edition of the Étoile de Bessèges.

Teams 
Nine of the 18 UCI WorldTeams, nine UCI ProTeams, and three UCI Continental teams made up the 21 teams that participated in the race. Each team entered a full squad of seven riders, for a total of 147 riders who started the race, of which 123 finished.

UCI WorldTeams

 
 
 
 
 
 
 
 
 

UCI ProTeams

 
 
 
 
 
 
 
 
 

UCI Continental Teams

Route

Stages

Stage 1 
2 February 2022 – Bellegarde to Bellegarde,

Stage 2 
3 February 2022 – Saint-Christol-lès-Alès to Rousson,

Stage 3 
4 February 2022 – Bessèges to Bessèges,

Stage 4 

Stage 5 
6 February 2022 – Alès to Alès, (ITT)

Classification leadership table 

 On stage 2, Hugo Hofstetter, who was second in the points classification, wore the yellow jersey, because first-placed Mads Pedersen wore the coral jersey as the leader of the general classification. For the same reason, Mathieu Burgaudeau wore the yellow jersey on stage 3.
 After stage 3, Bruno Armirail was deemed to be leading the mountains classification and was presented with the blue jersey after the stage. However, before stage 4, the results of the KOM sprint atop the Col de Portes from stage 3 were corrected, so Jérémy Cabot became the new leader of the mountains classification and wore the blue jersey on stage 4.
 On stage 5, Pau Miquel, who was second in the young rider classification, wore the white jersey, because first-placed Tobias Halland Johannessen wore the yellow jersey as the leader of the points classification.

Final classification standings

General classification

Points classification

Mountains classification

Young rider classification

Team classification

Notes

References

External links 
 

2022
Étoile de Bessèges
Étoile de Bessèges
Étoile de Bessèges